Mauria membranifolia is a species of plant in the family Anacardiaceae. It is endemic to Ecuador.  Its natural habitats are subtropical or tropical dry forests and subtropical or tropical moist montane forests. It is threatened by habitat loss.

References

Endemic flora of Ecuador
membranifolia
Endangered plants
Taxonomy articles created by Polbot